Andrés Lage de Armas (born 27 November 1991) is a Venezuelan sailor. He competed in the Finn event at the 2020 Summer Olympics.

References

External links
 
 

1991 births
Living people
Venezuelan male sailors (sport)
Olympic sailors of Venezuela
Sailors at the 2020 Summer Olympics – Finn
Sportspeople from Valencia, Venezuela
20th-century Venezuelan people
21st-century Venezuelan people